are one of the traditional Japanese crafts.

There are various types of traditional dolls, some representing children and babies, some the imperial court, warriors and heroes, fairy-tale characters, gods and (rarely) demons, and also people of the daily life of Japanese cities. Some are manufactured as a local craft, to be purchased by pilgrims as a souvenir of a temple visit or some other trip.

History  

Dolls also have continuity from the  funerary figures of the subsequent Kofun culture (around 300–600 AD).

In the early 11th century, around the peak of the Heian period, several types of dolls had already been defined, as known from Lady Murasaki's novel The Tale of Genji. Girls played with dolls and doll houses; women made protective dolls for their children or grandchildren; dolls were used in religious ceremonies, taking on the sins of a person whom they had touched. , though not explicitly mentioned in The Tale of Genji, were soft-bodied dolls given to young women of age and especially to pregnant women to protect both mother and unborn child. Sources mentioning them by name start appearing in the Heian period, but are more apparent in the Muromachi period.

 are roly-poly toys made from papier-mâché, dating back to at least the 14th century. They are good-luck charms and symbols of perseverance and resilience.

Probably the first professional dollmakers were temple sculptors, who used their skill to make painted wooden images of children (Saga dolls). The possibilities of this art form, using carved wood or wood composition, a shining white "skin" lacquer called  made from ground oystershell and glue, and textiles, were vast.

During the Edo period (1603–1867), when Japan was closed to most trade, there developed both fine dollmakers and a market of wealthy individuals who would pay for the most beautiful doll sets for display in their homes or as valuable gifts. Sets of dolls came to include larger and more elaborate figures, and more of them. The competitive trade was eventually regulated by government, meaning that doll makers could be arrested or banished for breaking laws on materials and height.

Annual doll festival

These feature the emperor and empress, attended by a court retinue: warriors, ministers and so on. The most elaborate sets can fetch many millions of yen (tens of thousands of US$). The Doll Festival is celebrated to ensure girls' future happiness, and this link to daughters is rooted in the use of dolls in children's play. However, the Doll Festival itself has been part of Japanese culture only since the Edo period.

Types 
It was during the Edo period that most of the traditional doll types known today developed.

A full set comprises at least 15 dolls, representing specific characters, with many accessories, though the basic set is a male-female pair, often referred to as the Emperor and Empress.
  dolls are offered to Japanese children during the  holiday, in order to inspire in them the bravery and strength of the legendary Kintarō.
 , or warrior dolls, are usually made of materials similar to the  dolls, but the construction is often more complicated, since the dolls represent men (or women) seated on camp chairs, standing, or riding horses. Armor, helmets, and weapons are made of lacquered paper, often with metal accents. There is no specified "set" of such dolls; subjects include Emperor Jimmu, Empress Jingū with her prime minister Takenouchi holding her newborn imperial son, Shoki the Demon-Queller, Toyotomi Hideyoshi and his generals and tea-master, and fairy-tale figures such as Momotarō the Peach Boy or Kintarō the Golden Boy.
  dolls show fat, cute babies in a simplified form. The basic  is an almost-naked sitting boy, carved all in one piece, with very white skin, though  with elaborate clothing, hairstyle, and accessories, female as well as male, became popular as well. They developed as a gifts associated with the Imperial court, and  could be translated "palace" or "court".
  dolls are made of wood. They start with a carved and/or molded base of wood, wood composite, or (in some modern dolls) plastic foam. A design of different patterned cloth scraps is planned out, and the base is grooved so that the edges of the cloth can be hidden in the grooves. The cloth is glued on and the edges tucked in. These dolls have become a very popular craft and kits with finished heads can be purchased. The method is also used by some of Japan's avant-garde dollmakers, who adapt the old materials to new visions.
 , puppets or dolls are mechanical; they include the large figures on festival floats, for festivals like Kyoto's Gion Matsuri and smaller entertaining scenes, often with a musical element accompanying the movement. They often depict legendary heroes.
  is a form of theatrical puppet theatre which rivalled and inspired the kabuki theater, and survives today.
  dolls have been made for 150 years, and are from Northern Honshū, the main island of Japan. They were originally made as toys for children of farmers. They have no arms or legs, but a large head and cylindrical body, representing little girls. From a simple toy, it has now become a famous Japanese craft, and now an established souvenir for tourists.
  are life-sized lifelike dolls, that were popular in  shows. Artists made  that were novel not just for their subjects that shocked viewers—figures lying in pools of their own blood, for example—but for their influence on Japanese dolls. The works of Matsumoto Kisaburō and Yasumoto Kamehachi, in particular, contributed to form an extreme sense of realism.
  dolls represent little girls or boys, correctly proportioned and usually with flesh-colored skin and glass eyes. The original  were named after an 18th-century kabuki actor, and must have represented an adult man, but since the late 19th century the term has applied to child dolls, usually made to hold in the arms, dress, and pose (either with elaborately made joints or with floppy cloth upper arms and thighs). Baby boy dolls with mischievous expressions were most popular in the late 19th and early 20th century, but in 1927 the friendship doll exchange involved the creation of 58  dolls representing little girls, to be sent as a gift from Japan to the United States, and the aesthetic of these dolls influenced dollmakers to emulate this type of a solemn, gentle-looking little girl in elaborate kimono.
  are spherical dolls with red bodies and white faces without pupils. They represent Bodhidharma, an East Indian who founded Zen about 1500 years ago; according to legend, he removed his own eyelids to prevent sleep from breaking his concentration, and his limbs withered after prolonged meditation.  dolls are charms to bring good fortune, continued prosperity, and fortitude to accomplish goals. Usually  dolls are purchased with blank eyes. One eye is filled when making a wish, the other when the wish is fulfilled. Wishes can be made throughout the year, but it is common in Japan to do it on New Year's Day.
  ("shine-shine monk") are strictly speaking not a type of doll. They are handmade of white paper or cloth, and hung from a window by a string to bring good weather and prevent rain.
  dolls ("crawling child") are a soft-bodied doll given to young women of age and especially to pregnant women in Japan as a talisman to protect both mother and unborn child.

With the end of the Edo period and the advent of the modern Meiji era in the late 1800s, the art of doll-making changed as well:

 Silk-skinned or "mask-face" dolls became a popular craft in Japan in the 1920s and 1930s, allowing the individual to design elaborate kimono for dolls representing women of various periods of Japanese history, particularly the Edo period. Dolls of this type continued to be made and were a popular item for servicemen and tourists to bring back after World War II, though they also might choose dolls representing similar subjects made with  faces.
 Bisque dolls are made of fired clay.
They often lack facial features. Those from Shimane Prefecture are especially famous.
 More recent and less traditional Japanese dolls are ball-jointed dolls (BJDs), whose growth in popularity has spread to the US and other countries since the advent of the Super Dollfie, first made by Volks in 1999. BJDs can be very realistic-looking or based more on the anime aesthetic. They are made of polyurethane resin which makes them very durable. These dolls are highly customizable in that owners can sand them, change out their wig and eye colors, and even change their face paint. Because of this hands-on aspect of customization, they are not only popular with collectors, but also with hobbyists.

Collectors

Japanese dolls are broken down into several subcategories.

In the 19th century,  were introduced to the West. Doll collecting has since become a popular pastime in the West. Famous well known collectors from the West include individuals such as James Tissot (1836–1902), Jules Adeline (1845–1909), Eloise Thomas (1907–1982), and Samuel Pryor (1898–1985). James Tissot was known to be a religious history painter. In 1862, after attending a London Exhibition, he was drawn to Japanese art. During the 1860s, Tissot was known as one of the most important collectors of Japanese art in Paris. Adeline was known as a working artist and he is also known as "Mikika". Adeline produced many works throughout his career as a working artist. He is best known for his etchings and received the Cross of the Legion of Honor for his Vieux-Roven "Le Parvis Notre-Dame". Unlike Tissot, Adeline is recognized as a true collector.

During the Meiji period, three men became pioneers in collecting : Shimizu Seifū (1851–1913), Nishizawa Senko (1864–1914), and Tsuboi Shōgorō (1863–1913). Shimizu, an artist and calligrapher, put his artistic ability to use by creating an illustrated catalog of his own collection of 440  dolls. The catalog was published in 1891, under the title . He was an active researcher, collector of stories, documents, and information relating to the development of  during the Edo period. Nishizawa's son Tekiho (1889–1965) inherited his collection, but a great portion of the collection was lost in the Kanto earthquake of 1923.

Dolls have been a part of Japanese Culture for many years, and the phenomenon of collecting them is still practiced. Many collections are preserved in museums, including the Peabody Essex Museum, Kyoto National Museum, and the Yodoko Guest House.

See also
 
 Japanese craft

References

Further reading
 Albert, Kathy. Japanese Boy and Girl Paper Dolls. New York: Dover Publications, Inc., 1991.
 Larson, Jack Lenor. Folk Art from the Global Village. Santa Fe, NM: Museum of New Mexico Press, 1995.
 Pate, Alan Scott. Japanese Dolls: The Fascinating World of Ningyō. Tokyo, Rutland, Singapore: Tuttle Publishing, 2008.

External links 

 Oxford College Collection of Asian Artifacts (collection of Japanese dolls), at Oxford College of Emory University